Dynamo, also Dinamo, (Belarusian: Дынама) was a sports and fitness society created in 1923 in the Soviet Union. The society was an association of multi-sport clubs whose members were drawn from the NKVD and, after World War II, the MVD and the KGB. With the Soviet occupation of Eastern Europe after World War II, similar Dynamo societies were established throughout the Eastern Bloc, such as SV Dynamo (East Germany).

Since 2016, Vladimir Strzhalkovskiy is the Chairman of the Dynamo Society.

Overview

Name
The name given to the society was supposed to mean "Power in Motion", taken from the Greek: δύναμις; dynamis -power, and Latin: motio, -motion. Not coincidentally, this term was first coined earlier by a Belgian inventor Zenobe Gramme for the electrical generator. Dynamo, together with Armed Forces sports societies, made up the universal system of physical education and sports of the USSR. Forty-five sports disciplines were sanctioned by the society in 1971. It had some 6,000 sports facilities and 43 Children and Youth Sport Schools.

History

The "Dinamo" society was officially created on 18 April 1923, on Felix Dzerzhinsky's initiative and under the sponsorship of the State Political Directorate (GPU), the Soviet political police, the predecessor of other later created Soviet security structures such as KGB, NKVD and MVD. For the rest of the society's history in the Soviet period, it maintained some connection with the state security apparatus. The forerunner of Dynamo was the State Political Directorate Physical Culture society that existed since 1917.

On 12 August 1923 in Moscow at Orlovo-Davydovsky pereulok (lane) was opened the first Dynamo stadium named after Dzerzhinsky.

On 23 August 1923 the presidium of the Moscow Proletarian Sports Society Dynamo reviewed a petition of the Penza Governorate GPU Political Department about establishing of the local Proletarian Sports Society Dynamo. This was the first practical step in development of departmental sports society on nationwide scale.

On 1 – 16 September 1923 the Moscow Proletarian Sports Society Dynamo participated in the First All-Union Festival of Physical Culture in Moscow.

On 11 September 1923 the Moscow Proletarian Sports Society Dynamo dispatched two of its members to Petrograd to organize local Dynamo society in the city.

On 2 October 1923 the All-Union Council of Physical Culture considering specifics of the GPU activities admitted as practical the existence of the GPU sports organization "Dynamo".

On 16 October 1923 the All-Union Council of Physical Culture adopted a resolution "About Central Council of the PSS Dynamo".

On 11 December 1923 Dynamo opened its own cinema theater at Rusakovskaya ulica in Moscow.

On 2 January 1924 there was opened the first Dynamo specialized store at Kuznetsky bridge in Moscow.

On 1 August 1924 Genrikh Yagoda was appointed one of the members of the All-Union Council of Physical Culture from OGPU.

On 1 October 1924 OGPU issued its order "On establishment of the Central Council of proletarian sports societies (PSS) Dynamo and about organization of local PSS Dynamo". The Central Council was officially founded on 8 October, but its functions continued to be performed by council of the Moscow PSS Dynamo until April of 1926.

On 22 November 1927 the society became a sponsor of Fizkultura i sport publisher and mandated its members to subscribe to the publisher's magazine.

On 8 August 1929 took place a final match of the First All-Union football championship of Dynamo society, which involved over 40 teams. During the game Dynamo Moscow beat Dynamo Ukraine becoming the first champions.

In 1932 there existed 309 regional PSS and 2249 district-level cells of Dynamo.

On 22 November 1935 Central Council of the Dynamo sports society dispatched a brigade of Dynamo for three months to help organize sports activities at the mine "Central coal mine – Irmino" on help call of Alexey Stakhanov.

On 26 November 1935 Central Council of Dynamo congratulated "Dynamo–Ukraine" with 5th anniversary in organization of the first in the Soviet Union sports aviation by group of enthusiasts from Kharkiv. Experience of the Ukrainian aviation section was used to unfold activities in training of pilots in the Dynamo's organization system as well as the Osoaviakhim.

At the end of 1935 Central Council of Komsomol and Presidium of the All-Union Council of Physical Culture adopted a decision to pay leading sports people for their physical culture activities.

On 14 December 1936 Central Council of Dynamo paid all its players and coach of the football team 500 rubles at the end of season.

In 1937 the sports club was honored with the Soviet Order of Lenin.

On 16 November 1938 chairman of the All-Union Committee of Physical Culture and Sports recognized Dynamo as a founding father of Sambo martial art.

In 1939 all regional Proletarian Sports Society were merged into one All-Union fitness and sports society "Dynamo".

On 31 July 1940 the Government Commission honored the Dynamo sports society with Red Banner for performance in the All-Union Physical Culture parade at the Moscow's Red Square.

On 23 July 1941, the Central Council of the Dynamo sports society was evacuated to Kazan due to advancement of Nazi Germany to Moscow.

On 31 August 1954 the central council and all leadership posts of the sports society became fully elected rather than being appointed as before.

The name of the society also became well-known internationally through many clubs in various sports, initially created under the auspices of the Soviet Dynamo society (a partial list of sports includes football (soccer), bandy, ice hockey, basketball, volleyball, and handball) or just bore the name "Dynamo", with many such clubs attaining much international acclaim, such as in football: KF Dinamo Tirana, Dinamo Baku, FC Dinamo București, Dinamo Sofia,  FC Dynamo Kyiv, FC Dynamo Moscow, FC Dinamo Tbilisi, FC Dinamo Minsk, FC Dinamo Brest, JK Dünamo Tallinn, NK Dinamo Zagreb (Croatia), Sportvereinigung Dynamo (East Germany: including BFC Dynamo, SG Dynamo Dresden and SC Dynamo Berlin), in ice hockey: HC Dynamo Moscow, Dynamo Kyiv (now Sokil Kyiv), HC Dinamo Minsk, and Dinamo Riga. Similarly-named clubs were created in many countries of the Eastern bloc. Many clubs, now transformed into the regular private clubs of their respective national leagues, still function under their original Dinamo or Dynamo name but their history is the only connection with the old Dynamo society.

Structure

Currently, Dynamo is an All-Russian fitness-sports society based in Moscow. The society also has several affiliations abroad in Albania, Armenia, Azerbaijan, Belarus, Bulgaria, Estonia, Georgia, Kazakhstan, Kyrgyzstan, Latvia, Moldova, Romania, Tajikistan, Turkmenistan, and Ukraine.

There is the International coordination council of Dynamo's organizations which includes:
 Sports Association "Interclub" of Ministry of Interior (Albania)
 Sports Public Organization "Dynamo" (Armenia)
 Republican State-Public Union "Belarusian Fitness-Sports Society Dynamo"
 Fitness-Sports Club "Dynamo" (Georgia)
 Sports Organization "Fiamme ORO" of Ministry of Interior (Italy)
 Public Union "Fitness-Sports Society Dynamo" (Kazakhstan)
 Public Union "Kyrgyz Fitness-Sports Society Dynamo"
 Sports Society "Dynamo" (Latvia)
 Central Sports Club "Dynamo" of Ministry of Interior (Moldova)
 Sports Organization "Khuch"
 Public-State Union "All-Russian Fitness-Sports Society Dynamo"
 Sports Society "Dynamo" (Romania)
 Sports Society "Dynamo" of Ministry of Interior (Tajikistan)
 Sports Club "Galkan" of Ministry of Interior (Turkmenistan)
 Fitness-Sports Society "Dynamo" (Ukraine)

Several organizations are observers:
 Fitness-Sports Charter "Dynamo" (Georgia)
 Sports Society of Ministry of Interior (Azerbaijan)
 Fitness-Sports Society "Dynamo" (Uzbekistan)

Chairs of the Central Council

Chairs of the Society
 1923 Felix Dzerzhinsky (honorary)
 1923 – 1923 Józef Unszlicht
 1923 – 1929 Genrikh Yagoda
 1929 – 1931 Stanislav Messing
 1931 – 1933 Vsevolod Balitsky
 1933 – 1936 Georgy Prokofyev
 1936 – 1938 Mikhail Frinovsky

Chairs of the Central Council
 1939 – 1941 Ivan Maslennikov
 1941 – 1943 Viktor Abakumov (interim)
 1943 – 1946 Boris Obruchnikov
 1946 – 1948 Arkadiy Apollonov
 1950 – 1951 Nikolay Selivanovsky
 1951 – 1951 Sergei Goglidze
 1951 – 1953 Alexey Yepishev
 1953 – 1953 Ivan Maslennikov
 1953 – 1960 Semyon Perevyortkin
 1973 – 1986 Pyotr Bogdanov

Notable members

Ludmilla Tourischeva (artistic gymnastics)
Natalia Shaposhnikova (artistic gymnastics)
Viktor Saneyev (athletics)
Tatiana Ovechkina (basketball)
Aleksandr Tikhonov (biathlon)
Valeri Popenchenko (boxing)
Uladzimir Parfianovich (canoeing)
David Bronstein (chess)
Vyacheslav Vedenin (cross-country skiing)
Gintautas Umaras (cycling)
Vadym Gutzeit (fencing)
Alexandr Romankov (fencing)
Iosif Vitebskiy (born 1938), epee fencer, Soviet Ukrainian Olympic medalist and world champion and fencing coach
Aleksandr Gorshkov (figure skating)
Lev Yashin (football)
Vyacheslav Atavin (handball)
Aleksandr Maltsev (ice hockey)
Viktor Kosichkin (speed skating)
Igor Polyansky (swimming)
Alex Metreveli (tennis)
Yury Zakharevich (weightlifting)
Viktoria Komova (artistic gymnastics)

See also
KF Dinamo Tirana
FC Dynamo Kyiv
FC Dinamo București
FC Dinamo Minsk
Dynamo Moscow
FC Dynamo Moscow
Dynamo Moscow Bandy Club
 FK Dinamo Samarqand
Dynamo Kazan Bandy Club
FC Dinamo Tbilisi
GNK Dinamo Zagreb
SV Dynamo
Voluntary Sports Societies of the USSR
Dynamo Stadium
Dynamo Dresden
Berliner FC Dynamo

References

External links
 All-Russia society of sports and physical training "Dinamo"
 Official website

 
1923 establishments in the Soviet Union
Sports organizations established in 1923
Sport societies in the Soviet Union
Multi-sport clubs in Russia
KGB
Recipients of the Order of Lenin